The Crommyonian Sow  ( Hus Krommúōn, also called  (Phaia "Grey") after the woman who owned it) is a pig in Greek mythology.

Mythology
The Crommyonian Sow was a wild pig that ravaged the region around the village of Crommyon between Megara and Corinth, and was eventually slain by Theseus in his early adventures. According to the Bibliotheca of Pseudo-Apollodorus, it was said by some to be the daughter of Echidna and Typhon, and was named after  the old woman who raised it. According to Strabo, the sow was said to be the mother of the Calydonian Boar. Gaius Julius Hyginus says that the pig Theseus killed at Crommyon was a boar.

Plutarch repeats the story, but states that he had also been told that Phaia herself was a murderous female robber, and was nicknamed "Sow" because of her  obese children and uncouth manners, and that she was the "sow" killed by Theseus.

Notes

References
Pseudo-Apollodorus, Apollodorus, The Library, with an English Translation by Sir James George Frazer, F.B.A., F.R.S. in 2 Volumes, Cambridge, MA, Harvard University Press; London, William Heinemann Ltd. 1921
 Hyginus, Gaius Julius, The Myths of Hyginus. Edited and translated by Mary A. Grant, Lawrence: University of Kansas Press, 1960.
 Smith, William; Dictionary of Greek and Roman Biography and Mythology, London (1873). "Phaea" 
 Strabo,  Geography, Editors, H.C. Hamilton, Esq., W. Falconer, M.A., London. George Bell & Sons. 1903. Online version at the Perseus Digital Library

External links

The Theoi Project, "HUS KROMMYON"

Female legendary creatures
Greek legendary creatures
Labours of Theseus
Mythological pigs
Women in Greek mythology 
Wild boars
Fictional professional thieves